Rocky Oaks is a small nature reserve and wildlife refuge regional park on Mulholland Highway in the Santa Monica Mountains, within western Los Angeles County, southern California.

Park geography
The park is located within the Santa Monica Mountains National Recreation Area and managed by the National Park Service. The park entrance is south/coastward of the town of Agoura Hills, and west of the Kanan-Dume Road intersection on Mulholland Highway.

Park features
Rocky Oaks park showcases various species of native oak trees and California sycamore trees, some centuries-old.

Named trails include the Glade Trail,  Pond Trail, and Rocky Oaks Loop Trail.

An earthen dam near the center of the park creates a seasonal pond for wildlife.

The UCLA La Kretz Center Field Station is adjacent on the west side of the park, part of the La Kretz Center for California Conservation Science in the UCLA Institute of the Environment and Sustainability of the College of Life Sciences.

See also
Flora of the Santa Monica Mountains

References

External links
 NPS official Rocky Oaks Park  website
 NPS official Rocky Oaks site bulletin

Santa Monica Mountains National Recreation Area
Parks in Los Angeles County, California
Mulholland Highway
Agoura Hills, California
Santa Monica Mountains